Kelly Mawston is a former association football player who represented New Zealand at international level. Kelly Mawston made her Football Ferns début in a 0–1 loss to Bulgaria on 24 August 1994, and finished her international career with six caps to her credit.

References

Year of birth missing (living people)
Living people
New Zealand women's international footballers
New Zealand women's association footballers
Women's association footballers not categorized by position